Gozal Darreh (also known as Gosal Dareh, Qal‘eh, Qal‘eh-ye Gowzal Darreh, and Qal‘eh-ye Gozal Darreh) is a village in Kuhpayeh Rural District, Nowbaran District, Saveh County, Markazi Province, Iran. At the 2006 census, its population was 145, in 41 families.

References 

Populated places in Saveh County